Satarcha Salman is a 2023 Indian Marathi-language drama film directed by Hemant Dhome, produced by Texas Studios, and distributed by Reliance Entertainment. The film stars Suyog Gorhe, Akshay Tanksale, Sayali Sanjeev and Shivani Surve in lead roles. It was theatrically released on 3 March 2023.

Plot 
The film is based on the life of an ordinary boy living in Satara who wants to become an actor.

Cast 

 Suyog Gorhe as Amit Kalbhor
 Akshay Tanksale as Vicky Dhungane
 Sayali Sanjeev as Madhuri Mane
 Shivani Surve as Dipika Bhosale
 Makarand Deshpande as Arun Kalbhor
 Anand Ingale

Production 
Satarcha Salman is produced by Prakash Singhee under the banner of Texas Studios in association with Suresh Pai and distributed by Reliance Entertainment. This movie has been shot in Kenjal village of Satara.

Release 
The film was theatrically released on 3 March 2023.

Soundtrack 
Music is composed by Amitraj and Adarsh Shinde. Background score is by Aditya Bedekar. Along with the film, the title track was also shot in the villages of Satara.

References

External links 

 

2023 films
Indian drama films